Edwin Milton Fairchild (November 7, 1865 in Lansing, Michigan-1939) was a Unitarian minister and lecturer.

Fairchild was a descendant of Thomas Fairchild, an early settler in New England.  He was a son of George Fairchild, and grandson of Grandison Fairchild.

In 1911, he was a founder of the Character Education Institute.

On July 1, 1897, Fairchild married Mary Salome Cutler, a pioneer in the modern library movement.

References

Edwin M.
American Unitarians
1865 births
1939 deaths

External links
Edwin Milton Fairchild at Find A Grave
The Character Education Work of Milton Fairchild: A Prism for Exploring the Debate between Liberal Progressives and Conservative Progressives in the Early 20th Century, by Allison L. Jackson, 2018